The Strait of Bonifacio is the strait between Corsica and Sardinia, named after the Corsican town Bonifacio. The strait is notorious among sailors for its weather, currents, shoals, and other obstacles.

The most famous disaster in the Strait of Bonifacio was that of the French frigate Sémillante on February 15, 1855. Sémillante had left the port of Toulon the day before on her way into the Black Sea to supply the Crimean War with troops. A storm caused her to hit a reef; the ship sank and none of the 750 soldiers on board survived.

After a tanker disaster in 1993, the passage through the Strait of Bonifacio has been prohibited for French and Italian flag ships with dangerous goods. Passage for ships with dangerous goods sailing under other flags is strongly discouraged and subject to mandatory piloting.

Gallery

See also
 France–Italy Maritime Boundary Agreement
 Lavezzi archipelago
 Maddalena archipelago

References

External links

Bonifacio
International straits
Bonifacio
Bonifacio
Landforms of Corsica
Landforms of Sardinia
Landforms of the Tyrrhenian Sea
France–Italy border